Pietro Mocenigo (1406–1476) was doge of Venice from 1474 to 1476.

He was one of the greatest Venetian admirals and revived the fortunes of the Venetian navy, which had fallen very low after the defeat at the Battle of Negroponte in 1470.  In 1472, he captured and destroyed Smyrna; the following year he placed Catherine Cornaro, queen of Cyprus, under Venetian protection, and, by that means, the Republic obtained possession of the island in 1475. He then defeated the Turks who were besieging Scutari (now Shkodër), but he there contracted an illness of which he died. He was interred in the Basilica di San Giovanni e Paolo, a traditional burial place of the doges, with an elaborate tomb by Pietro Lombardo (illustration).

Coriolano Cippico (Koriolan Cipiko) (1425–93), one of Mocenigo's galley commanders, wrote a description of the campaign of 1474/75, providing an eye-witness account of Christian-Ottoman confrontations in the late fifteenth century.
Mocenigo was married to Laura Zorzi.

See also
Mocenigo family

References

1406 births
1476 deaths
Pietro
Republic of Venice people of the Ottoman–Venetian Wars
15th-century Doges of Venice
Republic of Venice admirals
Burials at Santi Giovanni e Paolo, Venice